Max Bernays (AOPV 432) is the third  for the Royal Canadian Navy. The class was derived from the Arctic Offshore Patrol Ship project as part of the National Shipbuilding Procurement Strategy and is primarily designed for the patrol and support of Canada's Arctic regions.

Design and construction 
The s are designed for use in the Arctic regions of Canada for patrol and support within Canada's exclusive economic zone. The ship has an enclosed foredeck that protects machinery and work spaces from Arctic climates. The vessel will be powered by a diesel-electric system composed of four  MAN 6L32/44CR four-stroke medium-speed diesel generators and two electric propulsion motors rated at  driving two shafts. The ship will also equipped with a bow thruster to aid during manoeuvres and docking procedures without requiring tugboat assistance. Max Bernays will be equipped with fin stabilizers to decrease roll in open water but can be retracted during icebreaking.

Max Bernays will be able to deploy with multiple payloads, including shipping containers, underwater survey equipment or landing craft. Payload operations are aided by a  crane for loading and unloading. The ship is equipped with a vehicle bay which can hold pickup trucks, all-terrain vehicles and snowmobiles. The ship will be armed with one BAE Mk 38  gun and two M2 Browning machine guns. The patrol ship has an onboard hangar and flight deck for helicopters up to the size of a Sikorsky CH-148 Cyclone. Max Bernays will have a complement of 65 and accommodation for 85 or 87.

The patrol vessel keel was laid down on 5 December 2018 by Irving Shipbuilding at Halifax, Nova Scotia. The ship was launched on 23 October 2021, and was delivered to the Royal Canadian Navy 2 September 2022.  The naming ceremony was conducted on 29 May 2022 in conjunction with that for sister ship . The ship began sea trials in July 2022.

The ship was delivered to the RCN in September 2022 for post-acceptance trials and it was indicated that she would be the first vessel of her class to be based in the Pacific region, starting in 2023.

References

2021 ships
Harry DeWolf-class offshore patrol vessels